Brandon Parva is a village and former civil parish, now in the parish of Brandon Parva, Coston, Runhall and Welborne, in the South Norfolk district, in the county of Norfolk, England. It is near East Dereham and Norwich.

History
Brandon Parva's name is of Anglo-Saxon origin and derives from the Old English for a small settlement with a thorny bush on top of a hill.

In the Domesday Book, Brandon Parva is recorded as consisting of 5 households and belonging to Count Alan of Brittany.

On 1 April 1935 the parish was abolished and merged with Runhall.

Geography
In March 2011, the population consisted of approximately 30 people. In 1931 the parish had a population of 111.

Places of Interest
L.F. & H.F. Harrison, Agricultural Engineers and Contractors are based in Brandon Parva.

Brandon Parva Treehouse
In 2005, four students from the University of East Anglia began erecting a carbon-neutral treehouse in the woods outside of the village. After two years of building, the structure was finally demolished by South Norfolk Council in 2009.

War Memorial
 Lance-Corporal Cecil H. Norton (1882-1915), 14th Battalion, Royal Montreal Regiment, Canadian Army
 Private Harry Purling (1890-1918), 1/4th Battalion, Devonshire Regiment
 Private George R. Allen (1888-1916), 11th Battalion, Royal Fusiliers
 Private George Dixon-Sutton (d.1918), 2nd Battalion, Lancashire Fusiliers
 Private Russel R. Pitchers (d.1916), 2nd Battalion, Royal Norfolk Regiment
 Private William Dixon-Sutton (d.1918), 7th Battalion, Royal Norfolk Regiment
 Private William Pitchers (d.1915), 9th Battalion, West Yorkshire Regiment

And, the following for the Second World War:
 Leading-Aircraftman Sidney D. Thurston (1920-1942), Royal Air Force

References 

Villages in Norfolk
Former civil parishes in Norfolk
South Norfolk